Donat O'Kennedy was Archdeacon then Bishop of Killaloe from 1231 until 1252.

References 

13th-century Roman Catholic bishops in Ireland
Archdeacons of Killaloe
Bishops of Killaloe
Date of birth unknown
Date of death unknown